Rudolf Gussnig (born 19 June 1969) is an Austrian football manager and former footballer who played as a forward.

External links
 

1969 births
Living people
Austrian footballers
FC Swarovski Tirol players
SKN St. Pölten players
FC St. Gallen players
LASK players
SC Rheindorf Altach players
Association football forwards
FC Tirol Innsbruck players
People from Spittal an der Drau
Footballers from Carinthia (state)
Austrian expatriate sportspeople in Switzerland
Austrian expatriate footballers
Expatriate footballers in Switzerland